Nicholas Goldsmith (born 7 December 1971) is a British film, TV and music video producer.

Goldsmith is one half of Hammer & Tongs, a production company. The other half, Garth Jennings, is normally credited as writer and director for their work.

Early life
Goldsmith was born in the United Kingdom on 7 December 1971. He was educated at The Haberdashers' Aske's Boys' School, an independent school in Elstree in Hertfordshire.

Career
Goldsmith has produced for many music acts, including Fat Boy Slim, and later became a film producer. He produced the 2005 film The Hitchhiker's Guide to the Galaxy and the 2007 film Son of Rambow.

External links 
BBC Report
Nick Goldsmith with Garth Jennings discuss Son of Rambow

1971 births
Living people
People educated at Haberdashers' Boys' School
English film producers
Music video producers